Colin Magnus Williamson (31 December 1913 – 29 May 1997) was an Australian rules footballer who played with and coached St Kilda in the Victorian Football League (VFL).

Football
Although primarily a ruckman, Williamson also spent a lot of time in defence.

Northcote (VFA)
He started out at Northcote, where he was a member of a premiership team.

St Kilda (VFL)
He kicked 18 goals in his debut season at St Kilda. Perhaps his best year was 1939 when he finished the Brownlow Medal count as his club's top vote getter.

Brighton (VFA)
Williamson coached Brighton to their first and only VFA premiership in 1948.

St Kilda (VFL)
St Kilda signed him on as their coach for the 1952 season and he remained in the role for two years.

Notes

References
 Holmesby, Russell and Main, Jim (2007). The Encyclopedia of AFL Footballers. 7th ed. Melbourne: Bas Publishing.

External links
 
 
 Col Williamson, at The VFA Project.

1913 births
1997 deaths
Australian rules footballers from Victoria (Australia)
Australian Rules footballers: place kick exponents
Northcote Football Club players
St Kilda Football Club players
St Kilda Football Club coaches
Brighton Football Club coaches